The Canterbury Infantry Regiment was a military unit of the New Zealand Expeditionary Force (NZEF) raised for service in the First World War. It saw service in the Gallipoli Campaign (1915) and on the Western Front (1916–1919). The regiment was formed by grouping together companies from four different territorial regiments based in the Canterbury Military district.

History
The regiment was formed in 1914 as the Canterbury Battalion. The battalion consisted of four rifle companies, with each company raised from one of the territorial regiments of the Canterbury military district, namely the:
1st (Canterbury) Regiment
2nd (South Canterbury) Regiment
12th (Nelson) Regiment
13th (North Canterbury and Westland) Regiment
Each company retained the name and cap badge of its parent territorial regiment.

Notes 

 Footnotes

 Citations

References

Infantry regiments of New Zealand
Military units and formations established in 1914
Military units and formations disestablished in 1919